Coleomethia is a genus of beetles in the family Cerambycidae, containing the following species:

 Coleomethia australis Hovore, 1987
 Coleomethia bezarki Galileo & Martins, 2009
 Coleomethia chemsaki Hovore, 1987
 Coleomethia crinicornis Hovore, 1987
 Coleomethia mexicana Chemsak & Linsley, 1964
 Coleomethia xanthocollis (Knull, 1935)

References

Xystrocerini